Arabian Horse is the eighth studio album by GusGus, released in 2011. It has the same line-up as the previous album, 24/7: Stephan Stephensen(aka President Bongo), Biggi Veira and Daníel Ágúst Haraldsson, and the return of Urður "Earth" Hákonardóttir and guest spots from Högni Egilsson of Hjaltalin and Davíð Þór Jónsson. The photo used for the cover art is by Wojtek Kwiatkowski.

Track listing
All songs written by GusGus.

Chart positions

References

2011 albums
GusGus albums
Kompakt albums